Hardmanoceras is a tarphycerid genus belonging to the Trocholitidae from the upper Lower Ordovician to possibly the lower Middle Ordovician, found in Western Australia. Hardmanoceras is like Discoceras but  prominently ribbed and with a depressed whorl section.  The body, or living, chamber is long, 1 1/8 volutions long.  The ultimate portion is slightly divergent, not an uncommon characteristic of tarphycerids.

Harmanoceras was named by Teichert and Glenister in 1952. The type us Hardmanoceras lobatum.

References

 W.M Furnish and Brian H Glenister, 1964. Nautiloidea-Tarphycerida. Treatise on Invertebrate Paleontology, Part K, Mollusca 3. Teichert and Moore, eds. Geol Soc of America and Univ Kansas Press.

Ordovician cephalopods of Oceania
Prehistoric nautiloid genera
Tarphycerida